This is a list of electrical generating stations in Nova Scotia, Canada.

Nova Scotia has twenty-nine power stations, and is still largely dependent on coal-fired generation, with some natural gas and hydroelectric generating stations. Nova Scotia Power, a subsidiary of Emera, operates the integrated public utility serving most of the province.

Fossil fuel

Renewable

Biomass 
List of biomass power plants in Nova Scotia.

Hydro 

List of hydroelectric and tidal generating stations in Nova Scotia.

Wind 

List of wind farms in Nova Scotia.

See also 
 Nova Scotia Power
 Energy in Canada
 List of power stations in Canada

References

External links
History of Electric Power Companies in Nova Scotia

Lists of power stations in Canada